is a railway station in Naka-ku, Hamamatsu,  Shizuoka Prefecture, Japan, operated by the private railway company, Enshū Railway.

Lines
Daiichidōri Station is a station on the  Enshū Railway Line and is 0.5 kilometers from the starting point of the line at Shin-Hamamatsu Station.

Station layout
The station is a viaduct station with a single elevated side platform. It is staffed during daylight hours. The station building has automated ticket machines, and automated turnstiles, which accepts the NicePass smart card, as well as ET Card, a magnetic card ticketing system.

Adjacent stations

|-
!colspan=5|Enshū Railway

Station history
Daiichidōri Station was established on December 1, 1985 as a commuter station in downtown Hamamatsu city.

Passenger statistics
In fiscal 2017, the station was used by an average of 1,420  passengers daily (boarding passengers only).

Surrounding area

See also
 List of railway stations in Japan

References

External links

 Enshū Railway official website

Railway stations in Japan opened in 1985
Railway stations in Shizuoka Prefecture
Railway stations in Hamamatsu
Stations of Enshū Railway